Miss Universe Thailand 2019 was the 20th edition of Miss Universe Thailand pageant. It was held on June 29, 2019. Catriona Gray, Miss Universe 2018, and Sophida Kanchanarin, Miss Universe Thailand 2018, crowned Paweensuda Drouin at the end of the event. She represented Thailand at the Miss Universe 2019 pageant on 9 December 2019 and finished in the Top 5.

This is the first edition of Miss Universe Thailand not being under the chairmanship of Surang Prampree, who was the president for 19 years. After her resignation, the organization is now chaired by TPN 2018 Co. Ltd. by Somchai Cheewasutthanon, Piyaporn Sankosik and Narong Lertkitsiri.

Delegates 
58 contestants competed for the title of Miss Universe Thailand 2019.

Crossovers and returnees 
Contestants who previously competed in previous editions of Miss Universe Thailand and other local and international beauty pageants with their respective placements:

Provincial Pageants

Miss Chiang Mai
2014: Sarika Froemert (4th Runner-up)
2019: Naruemon Sittiwang (Winner)
2020: Kansuda Chanakeeree (1st Runner-up)

Miss Sisaket
2019: Timmanee Jantho (Winner)

Miss Grand Bangkok
2017: Nutchananun Chantim
2018: Chanakarn Suksatit

Miss Grand Trang
2019: Orawan Seepanamwan (Top 11)

Miss Grand Trat
2019: Saowaluck Noophuak (1st Runner-up)

Miss Grand Nakhon Pathom & Ratchaburi
2019: Orawan Seepanamwan (2nd Runner-up Miss Grand Nakhon Pathom)

Miss Grand Nakhon Sawan
2016: Thanyanat Preemaneesith (Winner)

Miss Grand Phangnga
2017: Orawan Seepanamwan (Winner)

Miss Grand Phetchaburi
2019: Orawan Seepanamwan  (2nd Runner-up)

Miss Grand Ratchaburi
2018: Nutnicha Phongsuwan (Winner)

Miss Grand Lan Na (Chiang Rai, Phayao, Mae Hong Son, Lampang)
2016: Phatcharayada Sutthathidetphuwadol (Winner Miss Grand Chiang Rai)

Miss Grand Songkhla
2019: Orawan Seepanamwan

Miss Grand Suphan Buri
2018: Manussanun Limjanphaphap (Winner)

Miss Grand Sisaket
2019: Timmanee Jantho (Top 6)

Miss Grand Nong Khai
2018: Nutchananun Chantim

Miss Supranational Bangkok
2018-19: Chanakarn Suksatit

Chiang Rai Supermodel
2018: Weerada Yodjai (Winner)

National Pageants

Miss Thailand
2013: Paweensuda Drouin (1st Runner-up)
2019: Nutchananun Chantim 
2019: Risa Pongpruksatol (1st Runner-up; Resigned)
2020: Kamonporn Thongphon (3rd Runner-up)
2020: Patita Suntivijj (4th Runner-up)
2020: Praewatchara Schmid (Top 16)

Miss Teen Thailand
2012: Pichayada Phongcheep

Miss Universe Thailand
2015:  Patitta Suntivijj
2017: Paweensuda Drouin (2nd Runner-up)
2018: Sarika Froemert
2020: Chanakarn Suksatit (Top 10)
2020: Nuttha Thongkaew (Top 20)
2020: Patitta Suntivijj (Top 10)
2020: Praewatchara Schmid
2022: Patraporn Wang (Top 11)

Miss Thailand World
2012: Chawanluck Unger (2nd Runner-up)
2013: Natthasinee Wichaidit
2018: Nutchananun Chantim
2019: Chawanluck Unger (Top 12)
2019: Dooangduan Collins
2019: Pumirad Pingkarawat (Top 6)

Miss International Thailand
 2015: Vetaka Petsuk (Runners-up)

Miss Grand Thailand
2014: Patraporn Wang (3rd Runner-up)
2014: Vetaka Petsuk
2016: Phatcharayada Sutthathidetphuwadol
2016: Thanyanat Preemaneesith
2017: Orawan Seepanamwan
2018: Manussanun Limjanphaphap
2018: Nutnicha Phongsuwan (Top 20)

Thai Supermodel Contest
2016: Kim Docekalova
2018: Nutchananun Chantim
2019: Pichayanee Jaroenruxe

Miss All Nations Thailand
2017: Nutchananun Chantim
2017: Orawan Seepanamwan

Elite Model Look Thailand
2017: Kim Docekalova (Winner)

Miss Thailand Chinese Cosmos
2013: Paweensuda Drouin (2nd Runner-up)

Miss Thailand Asean
2015: Phatcharayada Sutthathidetphuwadol (Winner)

Miss Thinn Thai Ngarm
2018: Apisara Thadadolthip

International Pageants

Miss Earth
 2017: Paweensuda Drouin (Top 8)

Miss Intercontinental
2014: Patraporn Wang (Winner)

Miss Global Beauty Queen
2015: Vetaka Petsuk (Winner)

Miss Supertalent of The World
2018: Orawan Seepanamwan

Elite Model Look World
2017: Kim Docekalova

Face of Beauty International
2013: Phatcharayada Sutthathidetphuwadol (3rd Runner-up)

Miss Chinese Cosmos Southeast Asia
2013: Paweensuda Drouin (Top 8)

Miss Asia Pacific World
2012: Chawanluck Unger (4th Runner-up)

Notes

References

External links
 

2018
2019 in Thailand
2019 beauty pageants
Beauty pageants in Thailand
June 2019 events in Thailand